Tetramethylammonium fluoride is the quaternary ammonium salt with the formula (CH3)4NF. This hygroscopic white solid is a source of “naked fluoride", that is fluoride ions not connected to a metal atom in a complex. Most other soluble salts of fluoride are in fact bifluorides, HF2–. Historically, there has been two main approaches to prepare TMAF: (i) Via neutralization of tetramethylammonium hydroxide (TMAOH) with HF, and (ii) through the metathesis reaction of different ammonium salts with inorganic sources of fluoride, such as KF or CsF. Due to the high basicity of the fluoride anion, the salt reacts slowly with acetonitrile, inducing its dimerization to CH3C(NH2)=CHCN, which co-crystallizes.

Related salts
Tetramethylphosphonium fluoride  (CH3)4PF forms stable solutions in acetonitrile. It is prepared by reaction of the ylide with potassium bifluoride:
(CH3)3P=CH2  +  KHF2   →   (CH3)4PF  +  KF
In the gas phase, tetramethylphosphonium fluoride exists as the phosphorane, but in acetonitrile solution, it dissociates into ions. A more elaborate phosphazenium salt ([(CH3)2N)3P]2N+F−) is also known.
Anhydrous Tetrabutylammonium fluoride has been prepared by the reaction of hexafluorobenzene and tetrabutylammonium cyanide.

References

Tetramethylammonium salts
Fluorides
Nonmetal halides
Reagents for organic chemistry